Sargent's Garage, also known as the Robinson's Paint and Body Shop, Grand Spring Body and Paint Company, and Fabio's, is a historic building located in Des Moines, Iowa, United States.  Completed in 1924, this single-story commercial building emplifies vernacular commercial architecture. It features a rectangular plan, wood siding now covered with metal, and a flat roof.  It originally had a symmetrical facade, which has now been altered.  Its significance is that it is an early automobile repair and body shop, which was a new architectural form that was emerging in  early 20th-century Iowa.  It continued to serve this purpose until 1997 when it suffered a minor fire.  The building sat vacant for a period of time until it was renovated and reopened.  It was listed on the National Register of Historic Places in 1998.

References

Commercial buildings completed in 1924
Buildings and structures in Des Moines, Iowa
National Register of Historic Places in Des Moines, Iowa
Commercial buildings on the National Register of Historic Places in Iowa
Vernacular architecture in Iowa